Agriculture in Lebanon is the third most productive sector in the country after the tertiary and industrial sectors. It contributes 5 percent of GDP and 8 percent of the effective labor force. The sector includes a large informal Syrian labor and is dependent on foreign labor for its productivity. Main crops include cereals (mainly wheat and barley), fruits and vegetables, olives, grapes, and tobacco, along with sheep and goat herding. Mineral resources are limited and are only exploited for domestic consumption. Lebanon, which has a variety of agricultural lands, from the interior plateau of the Beqaa Valley to the narrow valleys leading downward to the sea, enables farmers to grow both European and tropical crops. Tobacco and figs are grown in the south, citrus fruits and bananas along the coast, olives in the north and around the Shouf Mountains, and fruits and vegetables in the Beqaa Valley. More exotic crops include avocados, grown near Byblos, and hashish (a major crop in the Beqaa Valley).

Lebanon's agriculture, which offers fertile land, landscaped terraces, and fresh and healthy produce, faces several challenges in recent years. Improper agricultural practices leading to soil erosion and impoverishment, depletion of underground water resources, water pollution and health impacts from inappropriate use of pesticides and fertilizers, and environmental pollution from haphazard dumping of slaughter waste and animal farms are from the main problems of this sector. Agriculture is also diminishing to rampant urbanization, such as in the coastal plains and in parts of the Beqaa Valley. The government's policies appear to be targeting the increase in the availability of water irrigation (especially in the South) and controlling the use of pesticides, with no or little investment or incentives for water- and soil-conserving irrigation techniques. The private sector is gradually taking advantage of new but small scale opportunities offered by organic farming and high-value agricultural produce.

History

Agriculture in Lebanon dates back to Phoenician times with the first trading activities taking place in the eastern Mediterranean. The wine making tradition, which has a 5,000 years of history in the region was a known skill for its ancient dwellers. The Phoenicians tended vineyards, made wine and exported a significant amount to neighboring countries such as Egypt, Greece and Assyria. Although the trading activity was active in that period, however agriculture was not their main source of wealth because most of the land was not arable; therefore, they focused on commerce and trading instead. They did, however, raise sheep and sell them and their wool.

During Arab rule in the Middle ages, the country enjoyed an economic boom in which the Lebanese harbors of Tyre and Tripoli were busy with shipping of industrial and agricultural products. Lebanese products were sought after not only in Arab countries but also throughout the Mediterranean Basin. This period of economic growth was later oppressed with the beginning of the Ottoman rule and the high taxes imposed on the Lebanese production.

In the first half of the 20th century, Lebanon had regained its past agricultural boom where almost one-fourth of its land had been cultivable (the highest proportion in the Arab world). After the 1950s and the prosperous decades that followed, agriculture faced a decline with the beginning of the Lebanese Civil War and especially after the Israeli invasion in the early 1980s. In the latter period, the government prepared plans to irrigate an additional 60,000 hectares, and by 1984 studies were under way on 6 major irrigation projects, all designed to be carried out as part of the 1982-91 reconstruction plan. However, with the Israeli invasion came a continuous diversion of water from rivers mainly located in the south. Even in the relative calm between 1978 and 1981, about 1,100 hectares of tobacco were destroyed, 300 hectares of agricultural land were abandoned because of land mines, and 51,000 olive trees and 70,000 fruit trees were destroyed, according to the United Nations High Commissioner for Refugees. By the mid-1980s Lebanon had become one of the world's most prominent narcotics trafficking centers, with the prosperous phase that it witnessed (especially in the Beqaa valley). Before 1975 much of this trade was exported by air from small airstrips in the Beqaa Valley. After the valley came under Syrian control, the drug crop left the country by sea through Christian-controlled ports to Cyprus, overland to Syria or sometimes through Israel to Egypt.

In the early 1990s, the Lebanese government and the United Nations Development Programme (UNDP) launched an initiative to replace drug crops with legitimate alternatives. The UNDP estimated some $300 million was required for rural development of the Beqaa. Lebanon was removed from the U.S. government's list of major drug producing countries in 1997. Nowadays, the Lebanese government is setting new agricultural policies, providing help to the local production and giving several incentives in order to increase the quality and quantity of Lebanese production.

The main agriculture areas in Lebanon 
Lebanon's main agriculture areas are: the Coastal Strip, Akkar plain with upper Mount Lebanon, Bekaa Valley, Mountainous region, Western slope of anti-Lebanon range, Southern Hills. Here are the following harvest type of each of these areas:

 The Coastal Strip: citrus, banana & horticulture & greenhouse production
 Akkar plain with upper Mount Lebanon: cereals, potatoes, grapes & vegetables
 Bekaa valley: potatoes, grains, fruits & vegetables
 Mountainous region: orchards & vegetables
 Western slope of Anti-Lebanon range: grapes, olives & cherries
 Southern hills: olives, tobacco, almonds & grains

Major agricultural products
Lebanon produces a variety of primary products for both export and domestic consumption. Lebanese agricultural exports are mainly concentrated in the Arab League countries. In 2003, approximately 350,000 metric tons of commodities were exported to the surrounding region, primarily Saudi Arabia, with potatoes being the fastest-growing vegetable export (30% of total exports). Other regions that import Lebanese agricultural products include North America (3,123 metric   and 1% of total exports in 2003), primarily the United States which imports products such as almonds, apricots, beans, cucumbers and gherkins, nuts and orange juice, and members of the  European Union. This table includes the top ten Lebanese exported agricultural products for the year 2004:

 Mt = Metric Ton

Crops

Lebanon produces crops in five major categories: cereals, fruits (not including olives), olives, industrial crops (such as sugar beet and tobacco), and vegetables. Fruit and olive trees occupy 45% of the total cultivated area, and have increased by about 230,000 m2 in the past 10 years. The area covered by greenhouse production has also significantly increased over the past years, from 6,700 m2 in the late 1980s to almost 50,000 m2 in 1999. Agricultural production in greenhouses is more intensive than in open fields and requires more agro-chemicals (pesticides and fertilizers). Agricultural production is concentrated in the Beqaa, which accounts for 42% of total cultivated land. The Beqaa hosts 62% of the total area used for industrial crops (including sugar beet, tobacco, and vineyards) and 57% of the total area used for cereal production. The North (Akkar and Koura regions) host 40% the area used for olive production in the country. Fruit trees cover 24% of the total cultivated area. This table lists the land used for major types of crops by Governorates (in m2) for year 1999: Lebanon also produces cannabis for medical use.

Livestock
Livestock production in Lebanon is an important activity, particularly in mountainous areas and in the Baalbek–Hermel area on the eastern mountain chain where soil fertility is relatively low. While the number of goats have been relatively stable for more than two decades, sheep production has increased sharply. In recent years, livestock production (goats and sheep) has relied increasingly on feed blocks and feed supplements, thereby reducing dependence on wild grazing and ultimately leading to more sedentary animal production. Bovines and dairy production is becoming increasingly popular. In the past five years, several medium-to large-scale dairy farms have been established in the North and in the Beqaa. Several grant and loan agreements (proposed by organizations such as USAID) have encouraged farmers to expand dairy production. The table shows the evolution of livestock production from 1980 to 1999:

Horticulture
Lebanon produces a variety of fruits and vegetables. The largest crops (more than 20 kilo tonnes in 2003) include potatoes, oranges, apples and grapes. Exotic crops include avocados mainly in north Mount Lebanon and hashish in the Beqaa valley.

Horticulture has traditionally provided the Lebanese with all their fresh fruit and vegetable needs, with a smaller export industry. However, loosened border controls and increasing imports have threatened local industries. In recent years governmental projects such as Export Plus have put into action the encouragement of local fruits and vegetables production, quality control and investment incentives for farmers in order to boost their produce and raise the level of the Lebanese horticulture industry. The tables below show the exported quantities of major crops (Metric tons) which include potatoes, apples and grapes, from 2002 to 2005:

Viticulture

Viticulture in Lebanon, which is considered a thriving industry nowadays, is mainly concentrated in the Beqaa Valley with wineries producing an annual amount of approximately 600,000 cases of wine. Wineries like Château Ksara, Château Kefraya, Chateau Musar and Massaya grow French wine varieties such as Cabernet Sauvignon, Merlot and Rhone varietals such as Cinsaut, Carignan and Grenache, along with some indigenous grapes like the Musar White, a blend of Obaideh and Merwah. Lebanese wine has an export success, with many wineries exporting over 50% of their production – and in the case of smaller wineries, as much as 90%. Exports cover several European and North American countries, France's Lebanese wine imports for example had 7% of the top 5 imports between the two countries' bilateral trade in 2005.

Dairy
In recent statistics from the Lebanese Ministry of Agriculture, there were 80,000 cattle, including 65,000 dairy cows, 350,000 sheep, including 315,000 milk sheep, and 450,000 goats, including 400,000 dairy goats. Of the dairy cows, 40% are of the local  breed, 26% are purebred Friesian imported from Germany and the Netherlands, and 34% are crosses between Baladi and Canadian Holstein. The Friesians and the crossbred Holsteins have a generally good milk production and are kept, for the most part, on small farms, with an average of five cows per farm. The majority of the sheep are Awassi and goats are local Baladi. Both are kept in extensive and semi-sedentary systems, where productivity is low. The value of exported dairy products has been diminishing in recent years except for cheese which has gained a significant rise in its value. This table shows the variations in value of Lebanese exports from 2001 to 2004:

Fishing

In a 1999 report done by the "Regional Socio-Economic Development Program for South Lebanon" indications reveal that Lebanon has 3,000 to 4,000 fishermen. Annual fish production in 1996 doubled in average over a phase of ten years, with production amounting to 4,485 tonnes (4,110 tonnes of sea fish and 375 tonnes of freshwater fish, mostly in fish farms). Fishing in rivers has relatively small importance in Lebanon with productions significantly taking place in the Lake Qaraoun (about 30 tonnes per year of mainly carp and trout production) and other rivers such as the Litani and Nahr Ibrahim.

While sea fish production in Lebanon is compared to that of neighboring countries on a km of coastline basis, freshwater fish production continues to lag behind. Absence of sea fish breeding along the coast due to strong coastal currents have been substituted by offshore fishing of pelagic fish (such as Tuna, Blue fish, etc.) using draglines. This type of fishing has become trendy in the past decade, mostly among sports amateurs equipped with motor speedboats.

Governance
Agriculture is a state responsibility in Lebanon, where the ministry of agriculture is involved in setting agricultural policies and regulations. In the 1990s, the Lebanese government has awarded 89 contracts in the agricultural sector worth a total of US$13.6 million and an additional 46 projects in the irrigation sector, worth US$51.8 million. Contracts include consultancy and design, as well as works and equipment supply. Capital investment in the agricultural sector includes the rehabilitation of the Ministry of Agriculture, land reclamation projects, as well as the rehabilitation of agricultural schools and research stations. The agricultural sector is struggling to survive in a competitive regional market. Through loans and grant agreements, the government has implemented large-scale irrigation projects and has taken steps to ban a long list of hazardous pesticides. However, there are many problems facing the agricultural development with effective extension programs, use of water-conserving irrigation techniques, and rational use of agro-chemicals still scant or localized.

Key Policies and Actions
 Banning dangerous pesticides, the ministry of agriculture banned 110 pesticides in 1998, including aldrin, dieldrin, endrin and DDT.
 Safe handling of obsolete pesticides, FAO supported a project in 1998 (US$101,000) to assist the Lebanese government in eliminating a stock of 8.5 tonnes of pesticides and train the staff of the Agricultural Research Institute to manage and handle the pesticides stock.
 Phasing out methyl bromide, the ministry of economy initiated the Methyl Bromide Alternatives Project in May 1999. The project has shown the efficiency of all available alternatives to methyl bromide over four consecutive growing seasons in 19 sites around the country, totaling 52 greenhouses covering a total area of 20.5 km2.
 Land reclamation projects:
 Provided assistance, either financial or technical, to 1407 farmers.
 Reclaimed 756 hectares of abandoned lands.
 Supported the construction of several earth-lined hill lakes (total capacity of 5,300,000 m3) and cement reservoirs (total capacity 500,000 m3).
 Terraced approximately 16,000 hectares. This is equivalent to 6.3% of the total surface area currently under cultivation.
 Improving water management, Canal 800 (a series of surface water distribution networks) and the IRMP will convert/add 32,255 hectares to irrigated agriculture. These irrigation schemes are designed to tap surface water resources and may therefore alleviate current demand pressure on groundwater.
 Promoting organic farming, the introduction and improvement of certified and labeled organic produce to local and foreign markets.

In September 1995, Lebanon through the Ministry of Agriculture signed the United Nations Convention to Combat Desertification (UNCCD). Lebanon has requested assistance from the United Nations Development Programme (UNDP) and the German Agency for Technical Cooperation (GTZ) to support the implementation of the convention and to establish a National Action Programme for Combating Desertification which was launched in June 2003. The NAP project has four immediate goals:

 Promotion of Innovative Trade Initiatives Promoted to Increase Market Opportunities for Dryland Products
 Sub-national and Local Level NAP Priority Projects Implemented
 Developing a National Resource Mobilization Strategy for UNCCD/NAP Implementation
 Flood Risk Management and Water Harvesting for Livelihood Recovery in Baalback-Hermel

Current challenges 
The country's focus on the banking sector, real estate market and a fixed Lebanese pound as a post war reconstruction strategy, led the government to not invest in the sector and its development. The state has favored the services sector over the productive sector, resulting in some major challenges in local agriculture: heavy use of traditional techniques for agriculture by farmers, high dependence on imports from seeds to pesticides and fertilizers, most inputs are imported. A major dependence of Lebanese landowners on foreign labor, namely Syrian refugees working informally, is also a challenge which came as a result of the lack of importance and investment given to the sector.

The informality of the sector constitutes an impediment in the development of the Lebanese agriculture. Lebanese and as well as Syrian farmers in the sector work informally, the agriculture work is unregulated, therefore there is so legal definition for farmer as a form of business. This absence of legal definition, implies the lack of social security such as pensions or healthcare. The inequitable system which thus is established as a result, favors exploitation of agriculture workers and clientelist relationships dominated by a few influential people who control access to opportunities, lands and resources. Government statistics does not include informal workers, male or female.

Farmers do not have a financial institution to provide them with credit. Suppliers, filled this gap for farmers and became their first and main source of credit, by supplying them with the inputs they need to harvest. These suppliers have created an unsustainable and excess use of inputs resulting in a huge dependency of farmers to the imported goods suppliers provide them with. The Lebanese pound being volatile, and with its devaluation in comparison with the dollars, makes it difficult for farmers currently to be able to access these credits. They are unable to generate an income in dollars to buy the input, which are imported, thus priced in dollars. Farmers now, buy less inputs, which result in poor harvest quality, less harvest output and a poor profit for farmers in the Lebanese pounds.

Selling to markets through middlemen is the standard way for farmers to sell their output. This form of business puts the farmer in an imbalanced power relationship with the middleman. Middlemen buy farmers' output much less than it is worth and sell it for more than it is worth. Even if farmers lose in this relationship, they are dependent on the wholesale market dominated by the middlemen.

See also

 Geography of Lebanon
 Mediterranean climate
 Eastern Mediterranean conifer-sclerophyllous-broadleaf forests

References

External links

 Ministry of Agriculture
 FAO Lebanon - Agriculture sector
Organic Food Market Segmentation in Lebanon - European Geosciences UnionGeneral Assembly 2015 

 
Economy of Lebanon